José Val del Omar (October 27, 1904 in Granada – August 4, 1982 in Madrid) was a Spanish photographer, film director and inventor.

Biography 
Val del Omar enlisted in the pedagogical missions of the Second Spanish Republic, and was a contemporary of celebrated authors such as Federico García Lorca, Luis Cernuda or María Zambrano, whose work is collectively framed within the so-called Silver age of Spanish literature and sciences.

Val del Omar described himself as a "film believer", a discipline which he formulated under the initials "PLAT" (Picto-Luminic-Audio-Tactile), his integrating concept of film. As early as 1928, he tested some of his most characteristic filmmaking techniques, such as the "a-panoramic overflow of the image", where the subject moves beyond the limits of the screen, or his concept of "tactile vision". These techniques were applied, together with sound explorations, to his work "Elementary Triptych of Spain", which comprises Aguaespejo Granadino (1953-1955), Fuego en Castilla (1958-1960) and Acariño Galaico (1961/1981–1982/1995), finished posthumously. His explorations were not particularly valued until after his death.

Filmography 
Estampas (José Val del Omar and other "misionaries", 1932, 13 minutes, B&W, silent, 16 mm).
Fiestas Cristianas / Fiestas Profanas (1934-1935, 51 minutes, B&W, silent, 16 mm)
Vibración de Granada (1935, 20 minutes, B&W, silent, 16 mm). 
Película Familiar (1938, 8 minutes, B&W, silent, 16 mm).
Aguaespejo Granadino (1953–55, 21 minutes, color and B&W, 35 mm).
Fuego en Castilla (1958–60, 17 minutes, color and B&W, 35 mm).
Acariño Galaico (1961/1981–82/1995, 23 minutes, B&W, 35 mm).

References 
 Val del Omar, María José & Sáenz de Buruaga, Gonzalo (edición), Val del Omar, sin fin, Granada: Diputación de Granada / Filmoteca de Andalucía, 1992.
 Val del Omar, José, Tientos de erótica celeste, Val del Omar, María José & Sáenz de Buruaga, Gonzalo (selección y adaptación), Granada: Diputación de Granada / Filmoteca de Andalucía, 1992.
 Sáenz de Buruaga, Gonzalo (edición), Ínsula Val del Omar, Madrid: Consejo Superior de Investigaciones Científicas / Semana de Cine Experimental, 1995.
 Sáenz de Buruaga, Gonzalo (edición), Galaxia Val del Omar, Madrid: Instituto Cervantes, 2002.
 Sáenz de Buruaga, Gonzalo (edición), Val del Omar y las Misiones Pedagógicas, Madrid / Murcia: Publicaciones de la Residencia de Estudiantes / Comunidad Autónoma de la Región de Murcia, 2003.
 Gubern, Román, Val del Omar, cinemista, Granada: Diputación de Granada, 2004.
 González Manrique, Manuel J., Val del Omar, el moderno renacentista, Loja, Granada: Fund. Ibn al-Jatib, 2008.
 Val del Omar, José, Escritos de técnica, poética y mística, Ortiz-Echagüe, Javier (edición), Barcelona: Ediciones La Central / Museo Nacional Centro de Arte Reina Sofía / Universidad de Navarra, 2010.
 Val del Omar, José, Tientos de erótica celeste (PLAT), Val del Omar, María José & Sáenz de Buruaga, Gonzalo (selección y adaptación), Granada: Diputación de Granada, 2012
 Viver, Javier, Laboratorio de Val del Omar: una contextualización de su obra a partir de las fuentes textuales, gráficas y sonoras encontradas en el archivo familiar, Madrid, 2010. .

External links 
Sitio oficial de Val del Omar
Biografía de José Val del Omar
Archivo Val del Omar
Val del Omar en Facebook
Val del Omar en Soundcloud
Val del Omar en Vimeo
Val del Omar en Ars Sonora. Monográfico sobre el trabajo de Val del Omar como artista sonoro, dentro del programa radiofónico Ars Sonora, dirigido y presentado por Miguel Álvarez-Fernández en Radio Clásica de RNE.
Desbordamiento - Val del Omar Museo Reina Sofía

Spanish film directors